Spirits and the Melchizedek Children is a psychedelic shoegaze band from Atlanta, GA. They have been described by The A.V. Club as the "Southern Sigur Rós."

History
Spirits and the Melchizedek Children began as the solo acoustic project of Atlanta-based singer-songwriter Jason Elliott. The band went through many iterations before settling on its current lineup. Their first album, We Are Here to Save You! was recorded by Ed Rawls (Black Lips, Those Darlins, Deerhunter) at The Living Room Recording in Atlanta. Their latest album, So Happy, It's Sad was recorded with Ben Price (OutKast, The Hives, Little Tybee ) at Studilaroche in Decatur, GA. The band's music explores themes of alchemy, mystery and the occult.

Members
Current Members
Jason Elliott — vocals, guitar
Bryan Fielden — drums
Nathan Sadler — bass

Former Members
Andrew Burnes
Chris Case
Darren Harrison
Craig Henderson
Joe McNeill
Ryan Odom

Discography
2011 - We Are Here to Save You!
Released: May 22, 2011

2012 - Look! - Single
Released: Aug 04, 2012

2013 - Song Bird's Grave / Oscines (Magicicada Remix) - Single
Released: Nov 09, 2013

2014 - So Happy, It's Sad
Released: Mar 04, 2014

References

External links
 Official Site
 Fallen Arrows label website

American psychedelic rock music groups
Rock music groups from Georgia (U.S. state)